"Deep Inside My Heart" is a song by former Eagles member Randy Meisner, with prominent backing vocal by Kim Carnes (who is uncredited on the single release). It became a hit in the United States during the summer of 1980, reaching #22 on the Billboard Hot 100. The song was a bigger hit in Canada, where it reached #12.

Meisner and Carnes performed "Deep Inside My Heart" on the NBC-TV late-night musical variety show The Midnight Special. A music video was also created for the song.

Chart history

Weekly charts

Year-end charts

References

External links
 

1980s ballads
1980 singles
1980 songs
Randy Meisner songs
Kim Carnes songs
Songs written by Randy Meisner
Songs written by Eric Kaz
Song recordings produced by Val Garay
Epic Records singles
American pop songs
Male–female vocal duets